Michal Rišian (born 23 June 1977, at Martin, Czechoslovakia), is a Czech and Slovak freediving champion and is a former continental record holder for Europe in one of the freediving depth disciplines – Constant weight without fins.
Risian is among the deepest diving humans in constant weight without fins ever, with the depth of 84 meters. He was also second in the Depth World Championship in Kalamata, Greece, 2011. 
So far (7.11.2011) he has 15 individual gold medals from the freediving national and international freediving competitions 1 continental and 3 national records.

References

External links
 Michal Rišian's painting

 Current Freediving World Records registered by Aida International
 Profile at Apneaman.cz (In Czech only)

Czech freedivers
Living people
1977 births